Nelson Hadley Falk (March 24, 1874 – October 31, 1924) was an American lawyer and politician.

Falk practiced law in Lake Mills, Wisconsin. He graduated from the University of Wisconsin Law School in 1896. He served in the Wisconsin State Assembly in 1915 and was a Republican. Falk died of pneumonia in Lake Mills, Wisconsin.

Notes

External links

1874 births
1924 deaths
People from Lake Mills, Wisconsin
University of Wisconsin Law School alumni
Wisconsin lawyers
Republican Party members of the Wisconsin State Assembly
Deaths from pneumonia in Wisconsin
19th-century American lawyers